San Lorenzo is a Baroque style, Roman Catholic church located on via Moretto, just north of Camera di Commercio di Brescia, and near Piazza Bruno Boni, in Brescia, region of Lombardy, Italy.

History
A parish church was located at the site since the 13th century, and rebuilt in 1751–1763 in the Baroque style using designs of Domenico Corbellini. The Latin cross layout is surmounted by an octagonal cupola with lantern.

Among the interior paintings are:

Savior emerges from Calvary by Grazio Cossali
San Biagio, 1st altar, by Lodovico Sigurtà
Crucifixion, 2nd altar, by Il Lucchese (Pietro Ricchi?)
Blessed Virgin and Guardian Angel, 3rd altar, by Santo Cattaneo 
Martyrdom of St Lawrence, Main altar, by Giambettino Cignaroli
Holy family, 5th altar, by Francesco Lorenzi 

The church is notable for an altar dedicated to the Madonna of Providence, with cherubs by the sculptor Antonio Callegari.

References

Lorenzo
Lorenzo
Lorenzo Brescia
Roman Catholic churches completed in 1763